María Ester Gatti de Islas (January 13, 1918 – December 5, 2010) was a Uruguayan teacher and human rights activist.

Biography
She founded Madres y Familiares de Detenidos Desaparecidos, (or Uruguayan Mothers and Families of Disappeared Prisoners) following the abduction and disappearance of her daughter, son-in-law and granddaughter during the Dirty War in neighboring Argentina in 1976.

She died on December 5, 2010, aged 92. Her remains are buried at Cementerio del Buceo, Montevideo.

References

External links
 Maria Ester Gatti (in Spanish)

1918 births
2010 deaths
Uruguayan human rights activists
Uruguayan educators
People from Montevideo
Burials at Cementerio del Buceo, Montevideo